Adjustable square may refer to:

 Combination square, a measuring and marking tool
 Double-square painting, a style of canvas used in art